Punching Bag is the fifth studio album by American country music artist Josh Turner. It was released on June 12, 2012 via MCA Nashville. Turner co-wrote eight of the album's eleven tracks.  The album includes the singles "Time Is Love" and "Find Me a Baby."

The album debuted at No. 4 on Billboard 200, and No. 1 on the Top Country Albums chart, selling 45,000 copies in its first week. It has sold 209,000 copies in the United States as of March 2015.

Track listing

Personnel
 Michael Buffer - vocals on "Introduction"
 J.T. Corenflos - baritone guitar, electric guitar
 Eric Darken - percussion
 Iris DeMent - background vocals on "Pallbearer"
 Shannon Forrest - drums
 Kevin "Swine" Grantt - bass guitar, upright bass
 Aubrey Haynie - fiddle, mandolin
 Wes Hightower - background vocals
 Steve Hinson - steel guitar, slide guitar
 Gordon Mote - Hammond B-3 organ, piano, Wurlitzer
 Frank Rogers - baritone guitar
 Ricky Skaggs - mandolin and background vocals "For the Love of God"
 Marty Stuart - mandolin on "Pallbearer"
 Bryan Sutton - banjo, acoustic guitar
 Russell Terrell - background vocals
 Colby Turner - background vocals on "Find Me a Baby"
 Hampton Turner - background vocals on "Find Me a Baby"
 Jennifer Turner - background vocals on "Find Me a Baby"
 Josh Turner - lead vocals
 Marion Turner - background vocals on "Find Me a Baby"

Chart performance

Album

Album year-end charts

References

2012 albums
Josh Turner albums
MCA Records albums
Albums produced by Frank Rogers (record producer)